Ivan "Ðalma" Marković (6 November 1928 – 15 November 2006) was a Croatian footballer and manager.

Playing career
Marković played for lower leagues' clubs Nehaj Senj, Poštar Zagreb and Sava Zagreb.

Managerial career
All along a manager career which lasted 40 years, he worked with Torpedo, Kustošija, Orijent, Dinamo Zagreb, Maribor, Zagreb, Toronto Metros-Croatia, Toronto Italia, Marseille, Dubrovnik, Sturm Graz, Radnik Velika Gorica, Vorwärts, Beltinci, Karlovac, Varteks, Samobor and Hamilton Thunder.

Selected managerial statistics

Note: results from 19 other teams are unavailable

Honours
Orijent Rijeka
Yugoslav Second League: 1968–69
Croatian Republic Football League: 1983–84

Toronto Italia
Canadian National Soccer League: 1976, 1988, 1989, 1992

Individual
CFF Youth Trophy: 1994

References

External links
  Profile
Izmk Profile

1928 births
2006 deaths
People from Senj
Association footballers not categorized by position
Yugoslav footballers
Yugoslav football managers
Croatian football managers
HNK Rijeka managers
HNK Orijent managers
NK Zagreb managers
NK Maribor managers
Toronto Blizzard managers
Olympique de Marseille managers
GNK Dinamo Zagreb managers
NK GOŠK Dubrovnik managers
SK Sturm Graz managers
SK Vorwärts Steyr managers
NK Celje managers
NK Karlovac managers
NK Inter Zaprešić managers
NK Varaždin managers
Yugoslav First League managers
North American Soccer League (1968–1984) coaches
Canadian Soccer League (1998–present) managers
Canadian National Soccer League coaches
Yugoslav expatriate football managers
Expatriate soccer managers in Canada
Yugoslav expatriate sportspeople in Canada
Expatriate football managers in France
Yugoslav expatriate sportspeople in France
Expatriate football managers in Austria
Yugoslav expatriate sportspeople in Austria
Croatian expatriate football managers
Expatriate football managers in Slovenia
Croatian expatriate sportspeople in Slovenia
Croatian expatriate sportspeople in Canada